Per Johannessønn Jordal (born 20 July 1967) is a  Norwegian jurist and politician for the Centre Party. He graduated from the University of Bergen as cand.jur. in 1993. He has worked as a lawyer, acting presiding judge in Gulating, and as a judge in Nordhordland District Court.

Jordal was secretary of the Centre Party in 1993 and a member of its central committee from 2003. He was a deputy member of Os municipal council. In March 2008 he was appointed State Secretary in the Office of the Prime Minister.

References

1967 births
Living people
Norwegian judges
Centre Party (Norway) politicians
Norwegian state secretaries
Hordaland politicians
University of Bergen alumni
People from Os, Hordaland